Since 1909, France and Ireland have played each other in a total of 102 test matches, with France winning 59 times, Ireland winning 36 times and seven matches drawn.

Apart from fixtures played in the Five Nations / Six Nations Championship competitions, four games have been played at the Rugby World Cup in 1995, 2003, 2007 and 2015, in which France were victorious in the first three and Ireland in the last one in 2015. The sides have also met on four other occasions outside the Five Nations / Six Nations Championship: in 1909 (the first match between the two teams), a one-off match in 1972 and two Rugby World Cup warm-up matches in 2011.

Ireland have a notoriously poor record in Paris since the end of the Second World War, only winning there twice between 1945 and 2000 (in 1952 and 1972), and only three times since 2000. In recent years, France have found wins in Dublin almost as difficult; it is one of the Six Nations fixtures with most distinctive record of home advantage winning out.

Summary
Note: Summary below reflects test results by both teams.

Overview

Records
Note: Date shown in brackets indicates when the record was or last set.

Results

XV Results
Below is a list of matches that France has awarded matches test match status by virtue of awarding caps, but Ireland did not award caps.

Breakdown

In the World Cup, the teams have played each other on four occasions, 1995, 2003, 2007 and 2015, with France winning on 3 occasions and Ireland winning once; there have been no draws. In these games, France have scored 113 points, and Ireland 60.

In the Five Nations (1910–1931 and 1947–1999), Ireland played France on 70 occasions, Ireland winning 23, France 42 and five matches have been drawn. 

In the Six Nations (2000–present), Ireland have played France on 24 occasions, Ireland winning 10, France 12 and two matches have been drawn. 

In other test matches, Ireland have played France on four other occasions, in 1909, 1972 and twice in 2011, with two wins apiece.

Images

References

France national rugby union team matches
Ireland national rugby union team matches
Six Nations Championship
Rugby union rivalries in Ireland
Rugby union rivalries in France